Wijesekera Don Simon Abeygoonawardena (born 3 October 1908 - ?) was a Ceylonese businessman and politician. He was a member of parliament for Galle electorate, representing the United National Party. 

Abeygoonawardena was educated at St. Aloysius' College, Galle and St. Peter's College, Colombo. He was the owner of Galle Motor Bus Company.

Abeygoonawardena first ran for the seat of Galle at the 3rd parliamentary election held in April 1956, where he was defeated by the sitting member, Wijeyananda Dahanayake, by 10,956 votes. He subsequently defeated the Prime Minister, Dahanayake, at the Ceylonese parliamentary election held on 19 March 1960. Abeygoonawardena received 10,480 votes (49% of the total vote), defeating Dahanayake by 483 votes. He lost however to Dahanayake a few months later at the 5th parliamentary election held on 20 July 1960, by 444 votes. 

Abeygoonawardena served as the Mayor of Galle from 1965 to 1970.  His wife K. M. Charlotte Abeygoonawardena died in 2009.

References

External links
 Galle Motor Bus Company

1908 births
Alumni of Mahinda College
Alumni of St. Peter's College, Colombo
Mayors of Galle
Members of the 4th Parliament of Ceylon
Sinhalese businesspeople
Sinhalese politicians
Sri Lankan Buddhists
United National Party politicians
Year of death missing